The third season of Nip/Tuck premiered on September 20, 2005 and concluded on December 20, 2005. It consisted of 15 episodes.

Cast and characters

Main cast 
 Dylan Walsh as Dr. Sean McNamara
 Julian McMahon as Dr. Christian Troy
 John Hensley as Matt McNamara
 Roma Maffia as Liz Cruz
 Bruno Campos as Dr. Quentin Costa
 Kelly Carlson as Kimber Henry
 Jessalyn Gilsig as Gina Russo
 Joely Richardson as Julia McNamara

Special guest stars

Recurring cast

Episodes

U.S television ratings 

The third season aired in the fall of 2005, as opposed to the summer, like the previous two seasons. John Landgraf, president of FX, stated that such a move was a "huge risk", since it stacked up "against the full barrage of fall network competition". The second season premiere rating was eclipsed on September 20, 2005, when the third-season premiere, entitled "Momma Boone", drew roughly 5.3 million viewers. Three months later on December 20, 2005, the third-season finale, entitled "Cherry Peck / Quentin Costa", drew 5.7 million viewers. According to Zap2It, of those 5.7 million viewers, 3.9 million were in the 18–49 age group demographic, "making the finale the number-one episode among the key advertising demographic of any cable series in 2005. It's also the largest demographic number for any single telecast in the network's history." Despite some criticism, the story arc involving The Carver attracted even more of an audience to the series than any of the seasons before, reaching its climax in a December 20, 2005, 2-hour season finale, entitled "Cherry Peck / Quentin Costa", which became the most-watched scripted episode in the history of the FX network.

Reception 
The third season received positive reviews from critics, holding a 71% fresh rating on Rotten Tomatoes. Brian Lowry wrote for Variety "The not-so-subtle genius of this show is its ability to have it both ways – to skewer our culture's obsession with youth and beauty while simultaneously reveling in it." Melanie McFarland wrote for the Seattle Post-Intelligencer that "Beneath this skin is one-of-a-kind daring television that explores the complexities of human relationships with an unparalleled intelligence, sensitivity, appropriate level of fun and, when it is warranted, menace." Some criticism was aimed at the casting, with Joe Reid of The Atlantic quoting "Some unfortunate casting decisions placed a good deal of the plot's weight on the shoulders of people like Rhona Mitra and Bruno Campos, which was ... a mistake", whilst Gillian Flynn, at Entertainment Weekly, was critical of the season's storylines and character development.

References 

Nip/Tuck
2005 American television seasons
Television works about intersex